Eduardo Gatti Benoit (born 1949) is a Chilean singer-songwriter in the tradition of Nueva Canción and Nueva Trova. His best-known song is "Los Momentos" (The Moments), originally recorded in 1970 by Gatti when he was a member of the band Los Blops.

External links
 
 Eduardo Gatti on "Itunes Store"

References 

1949 births
Chilean folk singers
20th-century Chilean male singers
Chilean singer-songwriters
Chilean people of Italian descent
Chilean people of French descent
Living people
Nueva canción musicians
20th-century Chilean male artists